Christopher Michael Beck (born September 4, 1990) is an American former professional baseball pitcher who played in Major League Baseball (MLB) for the Chicago White Sox and New York Mets.

Career

Amateur
Beck was originally drafted out of high school in the 35th round of the 2009 MLB Draft by the Cleveland Indians but chose instead to play college baseball for the Georgia Southern Eagles. At Georgia Southern, Beck was named the most outstanding player of the 2011 Southern Conference baseball tournament. After the 2011 season, he played collegiate summer baseball with the Cotuit Kettleers of the Cape Cod Baseball League and was named a league all-star. He was drafted by the Chicago White Sox in the 2nd round of the 2012 MLB Draft.

Chicago White Sox 
Beck started his career with the rookie level Great Falls Voyagers in 2012. He finished the 2012 season with a record of 4–3 in 15 games (6 starts),  innings, 4.69 ERA, 51 hits, 12 walks and 36 strikeouts. For the 2013 season, Beck was ranked as the White Sox #12 prospect. Beck started the 2013 season with Class A-Advanced Winston-Salem Dash but was promoted to Double-A Birmingham Barons late in the season. Beck finished the 2013 season with a combined record of 13–10 in 26 games (26 starts),  innings, 3.07 ERA, 143 hits, 45 walks and 79 strikeouts.

Beck made his MLB debut on May 28, 2015, as a one-day call-up for a doubleheader against the Baltimore Orioles. On June 21, 2016, the White Sox called up Beck from the minors. On his first game in the 2016 season, Beck pitched one inning, giving up one hit and one earned run, two walks and one strikeout for a 9.00 ERA. Beck was designated for assignment on June 9, 2018.

New York Mets 
On June 13, 2018, Beck was claimed off waivers by the New York Mets. Beck was designated for assignment on July 9, 2018. On October 2, 2018, he elected to become a free agent.

St. Louis Cardinals
On November 29, 2018, Beck signed a minor league deal with the St. Louis Cardinals. He was released by the Cardinals organization on July 27, 2019.

Somerset Patriots
On August 13, 2019, Beck signed with the Somerset Patriots of the Atlantic League of Professional Baseball. On August 29, he was placed on the ineligible list and left the organization to pursue other opportunities.

References

External links

1990 births
Living people
People from Jefferson, Georgia
Baseball players from Georgia (U.S. state)
Major League Baseball pitchers
Chicago White Sox players
New York Mets players
Georgia Southern Eagles baseball players
Cotuit Kettleers players
Great Falls Voyagers players
Winston-Salem Dash players
Birmingham Barons players
Charlotte Knights players
Las Vegas 51s players
Memphis Redbirds players
Somerset Patriots players